The 1997–98 Primeira Divisão was the 64th edition of top flight of Portuguese football. It started on 25 August 1997 with a match between Varzim and Porto, and ended on 17 May 1998. The league was contested by 18 clubs with Porto as the defending champions.

Porto won the league and qualified for the 1998–99 UEFA Champions League group stage, along with Benfica, who qualified for the second round. Braga qualified for the 1998–99 UEFA Cup Winners' Cup first round, and V. Guimarães, Sporting CP and Marítimo qualified for the 1998–99 UEFA Cup; in opposite, Leça, Varzim and Belenenses were relegated to the Liga de Honra. Mário Jardel  was the top scorer with 26 goals.

Promotion and relegation

Teams relegated to Liga de Honra
Espinho
União de Leiria
Gil Vicente

Espinho, União de Leiria and Gil Vicente, were consigned to the Liga de Honra following their final classification in 1996–97 season.

Teams promoted from Liga de Honra
Campomaiorense
Varzim
Académica

The other three teams were replaced by Campomaiorense, Varzim and Académica from the Liga de Honra.

Teams

Stadia and locations

Managerial changes

League table

Results

Top goalscorers

Source: Footballzz

Footnotes

External links
 Portugal 1997-98 - RSSSF (Jorge Miguel Teixeira)
 Portuguese League 1997/98 - footballzz.co.uk
 Portugal - Table of Honor - Soccer Library 

Primeira Liga seasons
Port
1997–98 in Portuguese football